Istochnik is a rural locality (a village) in Dmitriyevo-Polyansky Selsoviet, Sharansky District, Bashkortostan, Russia. The population was 228 as of 2010. There are 6 streets.

Geography 
Istochnik is located 16 km northwest of Sharan (the district's administrative centre) by road. Zagornye Kletya is the nearest rural locality.

References 

Rural localities in Sharansky District